Metro-Cammell, formally the Metropolitan Cammell Carriage and Wagon Company (MCCW), was an English manufacturer of railway carriages, locomotives and railway wagons, based in Saltley, and subsequently Washwood Heath, in Birmingham. Purchased by GEC Alsthom in May 1989, the Washwood Heath factory was closed in 2005.

The company designed and built trains for the railways in the United Kingdom and overseas, including the Mass Transit Railway of Hong Kong, Kowloon–Canton Railway (now East Rail line), the Channel Tunnel, and the Tyne and Wear Metro, and locomotives for Malaysia's Keretapi Tanah Melayu. Diesel and electric locomotives were manufactured for South African Railways, Nyasaland Railways, Malawi, Nigeria, Trans-Zambezi Railway and Pakistan. DMUs were supplied to Jamaica Railway Corporation and the National Railways of Mexico. The vast majority of London Underground rolling stock manufactured in mid-20th century was produced by the company. It also designed and built the Blue Pullman for British Railways.

History

Metropolitan Railway Carriage and Wagon Company 

The company was formed in 1863 as the Metropolitan Railway Carriage and Wagon Company , successors to Messrs. Joseph Wright and Sons. Joseph Wright built coaches for the London and Southampton Railway in 1837 and the London and Birmingham Railway in 1838. In 1845, he moved the carriage works from London to Birmingham, where he purchased  of meadowland in Saltley, adjacent to the Birmingham and Derby Junction Railway line. In 1854, the company built the first 12 carriages for the Sydney to Parramatta line, New South Wales, the first public railway in Australia, which opened in 1855. Several of those are now in the Powerhouse Museum in Sydney.

Metropolitan Amalgamated Railway Carriage and Wagon Company 
In 1902, it merged with four other carriage and wagon builders: Ashbury Railway Carriage and Iron Company Ltd., Brown, Marshalls and Company Ltd., Lancaster Railway Carriage and Wagon Company Ltd., and Oldbury Railway Carriage and Wagon Company Ltd., and became the Metropolitan Amalgamated Railway Carriage and Wagon Company . 

Metropolitan were contracted as a builder of the new tanks for the British Army during the First World War. They built all 400 of the Mark V tank and 700 improved Mark V* tanks. They were the most developed heavy tank designs to see service in the war.

In 1917, Metropolitan Railway Carriage and Wagon Company and Vickers Limited took joint control of British Westinghouse. In 1919, Vickers bought out the Metropolitan shares and renamed the company Metropolitan-Vickers. By 1926, they had changed their name again to Metropolitan Carriage, Wagon and Finance Company . In 1929, the railway rolling stock business of Cammell Laird and Company was merged as Metropolitan-Cammell Carriage and Wagon Company , the resulting company being part owned by Vickers and the Cammell Laird group. 

MCCW also built bus bodies. In 1932, Metro Cammell Weymann was formed by the MCCW's bus bodybuilding business and Weymann Motor Bodies. In the Second World War, Metro again built tanks, including the Valentine tank and Light Tank Mk VIII. The Saltley works was closed in 1962 and group administration concentrated at Washwood Heath in 1967.

Closure by Alstom
In May 1989, the railway business was sold to GEC Alsthom (now Alstom). The last trains to be built at the Washwood Heath plant before its closure in 2005 were the Class 390 Pendolino tilting trains for the West Coast Main Line modernisation.

Products

Heavy rail
 Southern Railway "Brighton Belle" EMU
 Southern Railway "Crystal Palace" EMU
 Southern Railway "Coulsdon North & Sutton stock" EMU
 LNER Tyneside electric units
 LNER Shenfield line electric units (driving motors and intermediate trailers only)
 LNER Glossop line electric units (driving motors and intermediate trailers only)
 The Blue Pullman
 Metro-Cammell Lightweight "Heritage" diesel multiple unit
 British Rail Class 101 "Heritage" diesel multiple unit
 British Rail Class 111 "Heritage" diesel multiple unit
 British Rail Class 151 diesel multiple unit
 British Rail Class 156 "Super Sprinter" diesel multiple unit
 British Rail Class 373 "TGV" electric multiple unit
 British Rail Class 465/2 "Networker" electric multiple unit
 British Rail Class 466 "Networker" electric multiple unit
 British Rail Class 483 electric multiple unit (Originally constructed as London Underground 1938 Stock)
 British Rail Class 503 electric multiple unit
 British Rail Mark 4 coaching stock
 Arlanda Express (X3) electric multiple unit
 Via Rail Renaissance Fleet
 MTR Metro Cammell EMU (AC) (East Rail line, Hong Kong – formerly operated by Kowloon–Canton Railway, leased to MTR post-merger)

Rapid transit

London Underground
 London Underground Standard Stock (Bakerloo, Central, Piccadilly, Northern lines)
 London Underground 1935 Stock (Central line)
 London Underground 1938 Stock (Northern, Bakerloo, Piccadilly, East London and Central lines)
 London Underground R49 & R59 Stock (District line)
 London Underground 1959 Stock (Piccadilly line, then Bakerloo and Northern line)
 London Underground 1962 Stock (Central line)
 London Underground 1967 Stock (Victoria line)
 London Underground C69 and C77 Stock (Circle, District and Hammersmith & City Lines)
 London Underground 1972 Stock (Bakerloo line)
 London Underground 1973 Stock (Piccadilly line)
 London Underground D78 Stock (District line)
 London Underground 1983 Stock (Jubilee line)
 London Underground 1986 Stock (Central line)
 London Underground 1995 Stock (Northern line)
 London Underground 1996 Stock (Jubilee line)
 London Underground battery-electric locomotives

Other systems
 Glasgow Subway rolling stock (Glasgow Subway, Scotland)
 Tyne and Wear Metrocars (Tyne & Wear Metro, England)
 MTR Metro Cammell EMU (DC) (Kwun Tong line, Tsuen Wan line, Island line, Tseung Kwan O line, Disneyland Resort line, Hong Kong – operated by MTR)
 Birmingham Maglev (Birmingham International Airport – 3 carriages built, in service from 1984–1995)

References

Bibliography

External links
 MCW archives at the Historical Model Railway Society, at Butterley in Derbyshire
 Metro-Cammell website

Locomotive manufacturers of the United Kingdom
Defunct manufacturing companies of the United Kingdom
Former defence companies of the United Kingdom
Defunct bus manufacturers of the United Kingdom
Rolling stock manufacturers of the United Kingdom
1925 establishments in England
2005 disestablishments in England
Manufacturing companies based in Birmingham, West Midlands
Defunct companies based in Birmingham, West Midlands
United Kingdom in World War I
History of the tank
United Kingdom in World War II
British companies disestablished in 2005
British companies established in 1925
1989 mergers and acquisitions